Emociones may refer to:

 Emociones (Vikki Carr album), 1996 
 Emociones (Julio Iglesias album), 1979